The Cold White Light is an album by the Finnish metal band Sentenced, released in May 2002 on Century Media. Limited copies contain the video for the song "Killing Me Killing You" from the band's previous album Crimson plus a free Sentenced sticker. Konevitsan kirkonkellot  ("The Church Bells of Konevets") was originally recorded by Piirpauke in 1974.

Track listing

Credits 
 Ville Laihiala – vocals
 Miika Tenkula – guitar
 Sami Lopakka – guitar
 Sami Kukkohovi – bass
 Vesa Ranta – drums

References 

Sentenced albums
2002 albums
Century Media Records albums